Pseuderemias savagei is a species of lizard in the family Lacertidae. The species is endemic to  Somalia.

Etymology
Although it has been stated that the specific name, savagei, is in honor of American herpetologist Jay M. Savage, the original work thanks Francis J. Savage for his "manifold hospitality and assistance", making him the probable person honored.

Geographic range
P. savagei is found in northeastern Somalia.

Reproduction
P. savagei is oviparous.

Notes

References

Further reading
Sczczerbak, "Nikolai N." (1989). "Catalogue of the African Sand Lizards (Reptilia: Sauria: Eremiainae: Lampreremias, Pseuderemias, Taenieremias, Mesalina, Meroles)". Herpetozoa 1 (3/4): 119–132. (Pseuderemias savagei, p. 129).

Pseuderemias
Lacertid lizards of Africa
Reptiles of Somalia
Endemic fauna of Somalia
Somali montane xeric woodlands
Reptiles described in 1965
Taxa named by Carl Gans
Taxa named by Raymond Laurent